Richard Jones (died 1736) was the member of the Parliament of Great Britain for Marlborough for the parliament of 23 January 1712 to 1713 and for Salisbury for the parliament of 1713 to 1715.

References 

Members of Parliament for Salisbury
Members of Parliament for Marlborough
17th-century births
1736 deaths
British MPs 1710–1713
British MPs 1713–1715